Raphael Benjamin West Jr. (March 19, 1941 – March 30, 2019) was an American politician. A member of the Democratic Party, he served in the Tennessee House of Representatives from 1985 to 2011.

Life and career
Ben West Jr. was born on March 19, 1941, in Nashville, Tennessee. His father, Ben West, served as mayor of Nashville and as a member of the Tennessee Senate. West Jr. attended Sewanee Military Academy. He was vice president of the First American National Bank between 1960 and 1984, and assumed the same role at Southtrust Bank from 1987 to 1994. West owned Security Express, LLC since 1996.

He was first elected to the Tennessee House of Representatives from the 60th district in 1985. West served 26 years as a state representative, and announced in February 2010 that he would not run for reelection. West died at the age of 78 on March 30, 2019.

References

1941 births
2019 deaths
Politicians from Nashville, Tennessee
Businesspeople from Tennessee
Democratic Party members of the Tennessee House of Representatives
American bankers
20th-century American businesspeople
21st-century American businesspeople
20th-century American politicians
21st-century American politicians